Marko Šiškov (born 8 January 1998) is a Serbian professional footballer who plays as a defender for OFK Žarkovo.

Club career
Šiškov made his senior debuts with OFK Beograd in the 2016–17 Serbian First League, collecting 10 appearances and scoring once. He left the club following their relegation from the second tier and joined newly promoted Teleoptik in July 2017. Throughout the 2017–18 Serbian First League, Šiškov played regularly for the side, making 27 appearances and netting twice in the process.

International career
Šiškov was a member of the Serbia U17s, recording five appearances in the 2015 UEFA European Under-17 Championship qualifiers.

Statistics

Notes

External links
 
 Marko Šiškov at Srbijafudbal
 

Association football defenders
FK Teleoptik players
OFK Beograd players
OFK Žarkovo players
Sportspeople from Pančevo
Serbia youth international footballers
Serbian First League players
Serbian footballers
1998 births
Living people